Sadqay Teri Mout Tun Punjabi film is a 1977 Pakistani action film.

Directed by Inayat Hussain Bhatti and produced by Nadeem Abbas. The film starring Inayat Hussain Bhatti, Neelo, Kaifee. Sultan Rahi

Cast

 Inayat Hussain Bhatti
 Sultan Rahi
 Neelo
 Kaifee
 Najma 
 Deeba
 Jaggi
 Munawar Saeed
 Khalid Saleem Mota
 Bahar
 Sawan
 Imrozia
 Altaf Khan

Track list
The soundtrack was composed by the musician Bakhshi Wazir, with lyrics by Waris Ludhyanvi and sung by Mehnaz, Inayat Hussain Bhatti.

References

External links
 

Pakistani action films
1977 films
Punjabi-language Pakistani films
1970s Punjabi-language films
1977 action films